Pachuca Puerto Rico is a soccer team that was renamed from Tornados de Humacao for the 2009 season in the Puerto Rico Soccer League.  The team plays in Humacao, Puerto Rico. It is affiliated with C.F. Pachuca of Mexico hints the name Pachuca Puerto Rico.

History

There is currently no history being that this is their first year.  Tornados de Humacao has history.

Puerto Rico Soccer League
2009 Season

Current squad

References

Football clubs in Puerto Rico
Puerto Rico Soccer League teams
2009 establishments in Puerto Rico